Cindy Weed is an American politician who served in the Vermont House of Representatives from 2012 to 2019. In May of 2022 Weed announced her candidacy for the Vermont House, running again for her former seat in the Franklin-7 district.

References

Living people
Johnson State College alumni
21st-century American politicians
21st-century American women politicians
Members of the Vermont House of Representatives
Women state legislators in Vermont
Politicians from Springfield, Massachusetts
Year of birth missing (living people)